Sant Gregori (la Cellera de Ter) is a mountain of the Guilleries Massif, Catalonia, Spain. It has an elevation of 1,090.8 metres above sea level.

See also
Guilleries 
Mountains of Catalonia

References

Mountains of Catalonia